Lewis Edgar Roberts (2 April 1918 – 3 March 2001) was an Australian rules footballer, railwayman and businessman, best known as a prominent player for the Port Adelaide Football Club in the South Australian National Football League (SANFL).

Early life
Roberts was born in Evandale, South Australia, into a family that lived in Dublin, South Australia. He attended Adelaide High School.

Football career
Roberts began his football career with Port Adelaide in 1937. He captained the club during the SANFL's war time competition from 1942–1944. After the war, he won the club's best and fairest award in 1946.

In 1948, Roberts again took the captaincy of the club along with coaching responsibilities in what was his last year playing for the club. Roberts' ability to kick the ball accurately to advantageous positions for his team mates was a notable part of his game.

Railway and business career
After beginning his working life as a junior porter in the carriage shed of the South Australian Railways, Roberts rose to be a train controller for the Railways. Then, at the beginning of 1953, he took office as General Manager of the Silverton Tramway Company, a position he held until the end of 1971. In that capacity, he oversaw the restructure and dieselisation of the tramway operated by the company between Broken Hill, New South Wales, and Cockburn, South Australia, and in the 1960s the creation of four subsidiaries.

In 1972, in the wake of the closure of the tramway and its replacement by a government-operated standard gauge line two years earlier, Roberts became Corporate Managing Director of the renamed Silverton Limited and subsidiaries. Under his leadership, the company, relocated to Melbourne, continued mine shunting in Broken Hill, and began working on property development and rail construction projects around Australia.

Personal life
Following Roberts' move to Broken Hill to further his career as a railwayman, he continued his sporting interests as Chairman of the Broken Hill Football League. He also became Chairman of the Barrier District Cricket League, and Vice President of the Broken Hill Golf Club.

References

Notes

Bibliography

External links

Australian rules footballers from South Australia
Port Adelaide Football Club (SANFL) players
Port Adelaide Football Club players (all competitions)
Port Adelaide Football Club (SANFL) coaches
1918 births
2001 deaths
People educated at Adelaide High School